The following lists events that happened during 1953 in Chile.

Incumbents
President of Chile: Carlos Ibáñez del Campo

Events 
1 January - A fire in a barracks in Valparaíso causes an explosion that kills 50 people, including 36 firefighters. The incident was caused by a flare launched at the New Year's celebrations.

February
13 February - The Central Unitaria de Traballadores(CUT) is created, which brings together the majority of the country's trade union centrals, and that day it celebrates its constituent congress.
16 February - The evening newspaper Los Tiempos returns to circulation after 21 years.

March
1 March – Chilean parliamentary election, 1953
23 March - The Ministry of Mining is created, being its prime minister Eduardo Paredes.

May
6 May – 1953 Concepción earthquake

June 
 15 June – Seven people were killed when a Chilean airliner exploded and crashed at the Copiapo airport.

July 
24 July - Carlos Ibáñez del Campo signs the DFL 126 of 1953 of the Ministry of Finance that creates the Banco del Estado de Chile.

December 
6 December - The Calama Earthquake occurs. With a magnitude of 7.4 degrees on the Richter scale, it affects the Antofagasta Region. The earthquake leaves 3 dead and 15 injured.

Births
3 January – Nicolás Eyzaguirre
2 June – Osvaldo Andrade
6 June- Mauricio Redolés
28 April – Roberto Bolaño (d. 2003)
16 August – Sebastián Edwards
11 September – Rodolfo Dubó
23 October – Joaquín Lavín
11 November – Evelyn Matthei
18 December – José Antonio Gómez
22 December – Coca Guazzini

Deaths
7 March – Juan Brüggen (b. 1887)

References 

 
Years of the 20th century in Chile
Chile